Casa Pierpiero is an Italian television sitcom airing on Disney Channel Italy. A spin-off of Quelli dell'Intervallo Cafe, the series follows young Pierpiero (Federico Mezzottoni), a rich boy who falls in love with a goth girl.

See also
List of Italian television series

Italian television series
2011 Italian television series debuts
2010s Italian television series